Kim Won-gun is a South Korean football player who plays for Gangwon F.C.

Club career
Kim Won-gun joined FC Seoul in 2015 as Rookie Free Agent.

Career Statistics

Club

References

External links
 

1988 births
Living people
Association football central defenders
South Korean footballers
FC Seoul players
Gangwon FC players
K League 1 players
K League 2 players